Georgy Konstantinovich Arapov (born 11 September 1999) is a Russian politician who was elected to the State Duma on the federal list for the New People party in 2021.

He is the youngest member of the 8th State Duma.

References 

1999 births
Living people
Eighth convocation members of the State Duma (Russian Federation)
21st-century Russian politicians
New People politicians
Plekhanov Russian University of Economics alumni